Guerin Elizabeth Austin (born November 30, 1980) is a television host, model and  beauty queen from Bellevue, Nebraska, who has competed in the Miss USA pageant. From 2014 through 2020, she was a sideline reporter for New England Sports Network (NESN), best known for her work at Boston Red Sox games.

Biography
Austin grew up in Seattle, Washington, in what she called a "hockey family," and figure skated as a child. Her given name was her grandmother's maiden name. Austin graduated cum laude with a degree in Broadcast Journalism from Oklahoma City University.  She was a Congressional intern for Representative Lee Terry, received an award from the Oklahoma Broadcaster's Association, and studied international media in London.

Austin won the Miss Nebraska USA 2004 title in a state pageant held in October 2003. During her reign, she spoke to thousands of school children and toured the USS Nebraska submarine and Camp Pendleton. It was her second attempt at the title, as she placed as a semi-finalist in the 2002 event. Austin represented Nebraska in the Miss USA 2004 pageant, but failed to place.

Austin began her broadcasting career as a sports intern for KETV in Omaha, Nebraska, covering Nebraska Cornhuskers football and Omaha Mavericks men's ice hockey. In 2012, she won a Capital Emmy award for a documentary of the Washington Capitals season which she hosted.  She worked as host of the Capitals Red Line program between 2010 and 2013.

New England Sports Network (NESN) hired Austin as a reporter in 2014, initially to report rinkside at Boston Bruins hockey games. She also become the sideline reporter for Boston Red Sox home games at Fenway Park. In June 2016, after the Red Sox made an extra innings comeback against the Chicago White Sox, Austin was caught in the crossfire of the team's exuberant Gatorade celebration, an incident covered by sportscasters around the United States. Several similar incidents occurred during her time covering the Red Sox. During the 2017 season, she suffered a concussion after fainting on a flight. After the 2020 baseball season, Austin's contract with NESN expired and was not renewed; Austin confirmed her departure from NESN in January 2021.

References

External links

June 2016 Gatorade soaking via YouTube
Miss Nebraska bio via Wayback Machine

1980 births
Living people
Miss USA 2004 delegates
People from Omaha, Nebraska
Miss Nebraska USA winners
People from Bellevue, Nebraska